Rhône-Alpes is a major European transit hub, linking northern France and Europe to the Mediterranean area. Millions travel along its motorways in summertime from Paris to holidays at the sea.  The E15 Euroroute (Britain to Spain) runs through the region.  There are international airports at Lyon, Grenoble and Saint-Étienne and many other minor airports and airfields.

The region is also a transport hub for the rail-network with the TGV running through Lyon from Paris and the north, to the Mediterranean.  A trans-national, high-speed rail-link is projected from Lyon to Turin.

Rail

Numerous cities of the region Rhône-Alpes are served by TGV :
 The LGV Méditerranée: Marseille, Lyon Part-Dieu, Valence TGV, and Montélimar.
 To Paris : Lyon Part-Dieu, Valence TGV, Montélimar, Chambéry, Grenoble, Bourg Saint-Maurice, Saint-Étienne
 In construction, a line to the North-East: Besançon, Strasbourg and Lyon Part-Dieu)
 In construction, a line to Turin: Lyon Part-Dieu, Challes-les-eaux, Grenoble-Université Gières

The TGV line Paris-Grenoble serves the international airport Lyon Saint-Exupéry.

Every weekend in winter, Bourg-Saint-Maurice becomes one of the busiest stations in the region, when it is served by TGV trains from Paris and from Brussels, and by Eurostar from London.

When a project of RER called Réseau Express de l'Aire urbaine Lyonnaise (REAL) is built, it will be the first RER of the province, the only other one being in Paris.
Another RER called CEVA is planned for 2017, for the region of The leman lake (Geneva, Annemasse, Thonon-les-bains, Evian-les-bains) with extensions to La roche / foron, Annecy.
Another railroad project is in realisation in Grenoble to link the suburbs.

There are also tourist train lines in Rhône-Alpes (in Ardèche, in the south of Grenoble and Mont-Blanc)

Road

Rhône-Alpes is a major European transit hub, linking northern France and Europe to the Mediterranean area. Millions travel along its motorways in summertime from Paris to holidays at the sea.  The E15 Euroroute (Britain to Spain) runs through the region.

Public transport

12 transport authorities of public transport are implanted in Rhône-Alpes
 The Rhône-Alpes region
 The department of Ain
 The department of Isère
 The department of Loire
 The department of Rhône
 The department of Sytral
 Saint-Etienne Métropole
 The Port of Isère
 The community of Pays Viennois
 The community of Villefranche-sur-Saône
 The community of Bourg-en-Bresse
 The community of Grand Roanne
The three largest cities of Rhône-Alpes are equipped with streetcars and have a large bus network. The largest, Lyon, has four metro lines.
Lyon and Saint-Étienne have kept their lines of trolley buses and, Saint-Etienne is one of the few cities in France to have retained its trams (in use since 1881).

Many cities also have their bus networks (Valencia the CTAV Chambéry the STAC, Villefranche-sur-Saône, Roanne, etc.). There are also networks of inter-departmental cars.

In winter, additional lines open to connect the valleys to ski resorts. This is the case between Grenoble and Chamrousse.

Finally, the airport Lyon Saint-Exupéry is accessible by regular shuttle bus from the major surrounding cities, including Lyon, Saint-Etienne, Grenoble and Chambéry. There are also links between Grenoble and Saint-Geoirs Grenoble and between Bouthéon Saint-Etienne and Saint-Etienne.

The Rhône-Alpes region is undergoing profound changes with regard to its rail network and many projects are being developed to the [Express Network of the urban area of Lyons, The Project of the East Rail Lyon, the Tram-train from the west Lyonnais.

Public transport links in Lyonnais

Métro

The Lyon Metro, in Lyon, opened in 1978 and now consists of four lines. It is part of the Transports en Commun Lyonnais (TCL) system of public transport.

Like the SNCF, but unlike all other French metro systems (excluding the RER), Lyon metro trains run on the left, the result of an unrealised project to run the metro into the suburbs on existing railway lines. The Lyon Metro owes its inspiration to the Montreal Metro which was built a few years prior, and has the same rubber-wheel cars and station design. 

The métro system consists of four lines, A-B-C-D, each identified on maps by different colours:

Lines A and B
Lines A (Perrache - Laurent Bonnevay) and B (Charpennes - Part-Dieu) were constructed using the cut-and-cover method, and went into service on May 2, 1978. Trains on both lines run on tyres rather than steel wheels.

Line B was extended to Jean Macé on September 9, 1981, then to Gerland on September 4, 2000. A further extension to Oullins is expected to open in 2013.

An extension to Vaulx-en-Velin La Soie on Line A opened in October 2007.

Line C

The Croix-Rousse-Croix-Paquet rack railway, which was refurbished in 1974, was integrated into the Metro in 1978 as line C, running from (Hôtel-de-Ville to Croix-Rousse). It was extended to Cuire on December 8, 1984.

The line was constructed using various methods; the incline rising through a deep tunnel, the portion on the flat at Croix-Rousse using cut-and-cover, while the section beyond Hénon runs on the surface. The Croix Paquet station claims to be the steepest metro station in Europe, with an incline of 17%.

Line D
Line D commenced operation under human control on September 4, 1991 between Gorge-de-Loup and Grange-Blanche. Rubber-tyred trains run automatically with no driver on board, controlled by a system known as MAGGALY (Métro Automatique à Grand Gabarit de l’Agglomération Lyonnaise). The line was extended to Gare de Vénissieux on December 11, 1992, at which time it switched to automatic operation. On April 28, 1997, it was extended again to Gare de Vaise.

Being the deepest of the lines in Lyon, it was constructed mainly using boring machines and passes under both rivers, the Rhône and the Saône. At 13 km (8.12 mi) long, it is also the longest of the lines in Lyon.

Operation

Tramways

Line T1
Operates from 4:52am to 12:27am, maintained by the Centre de Maintenance de Saint-Priest - Porte des Alpes.

Musée des Confluences extension to Musée des Confluences once the museum opens
Montrochet
Sainte-Blandine
Suchet
Perrache train station (transfers : Gare de Lyon-Perrache SNCF, Metro A, Tram T2, Bus 8 - 31 - 32 - 46 - 49 - 49D - 55 - 63 - 73 - 91 / Navette Presqu'Île - 96 - N4 - 101 - 105 - 125 - 175 / Airport shuttle - 182 - 184 - 185)
Quai Claude Bernard
Rue de l'Université  (transfers : Bus 53)
Saint-André
Guillotière (transfers : Metro D, Bus 12 - 23)
Liberté
Saxe - Préfecture (transfers : Bus 4 - 18 - 23 - 28 - 99)
Palais de Justice - Mairie du 3ème (transfers : Metro B at Place Guichard - Bourse du Travail, Bus 28 - 99)
Part-Dieu - Servient
*Part-Dieu (transfers: Part-DieuSNCF, Metro B, Bus C1 - 25 - 28 - 36 - 37 - 41 - 47 - 59 - 59E - 70 - 99 - 175 / Navette Gares Aéroport - Express Crémieu Bourgoin, Tram T3, Bus 198 - 296)
Thiers - Lafayette (transfer : Bus 1)
Collège Bellecombe (transfers : Bus 34)
Charpennes - Charles Hernu (transfers : Metro B - Metro A, Bus 27 - 34 - 37 - 59 - 59E - 70)
Le Tonkin
Condorcet (transfer : Bus 38)
Université Lyon I
La Doua - Gaston Berger
INSA - Einstein (transfer : Bus 69)
Croix-Luizet
IUT - Feyssine. P+R Tramway.

Line T2
Operates from 4:55am to 12:35am, maintained by the Centre de Maintenance de Saint-Priest - Porte des Alpes.

Perrache train station (transfers : Gare de Lyon-Perrache SNCF, Metro A, Tram T1, Bus 8 - 31 - 32 - 46 - 49 - 49D - 55 - 63 - 73 - 91 / Navette Presqu'Île - 96 - N4 - 101 - 105 - 125 - 175 / Airport shuttle - 182 - 184 - 185)
Centre Berthelot
Jean Macé (transfers : Metro B, Gare de Lyon-Jean Macé, Bus 4 - 11 - 18 - 35 - 47 - 53 - 96 - 175 / Navette Gares Aéroport)
Garibaldi - Berthelot (transfers : Bus 12 - 35) 
Route de Vienne (transfers : Bus 12 - 35)
Jet d'Eau - Mendès France (transfers: Bus 36 - 53 - 296)
Villon
Bachut - Mairie du 8ème (transfers: Bus 23 - 24 - 26)
Jean XXIII - Maryse Bastié
Grange-Blanche (transfers: Metro D, Bus 9 - 28 - 34 - 38 - 79 - 175 / Navette Gares Aéroport)
Ambroise Paré (transfers: Bus 28 - 38)
Vinatier
Essarts - Iris
Boutasse - Camille Rousset (transfers: Bus 81)
Hôtel de Ville - Bron (transfers: Bus 9 - 24 - 79)
Les Alizés
Rebufer (transfers: Bus 52 - 78)
Parilly - Université (transfers: Bus 81)
Europe - Université
Porte des Alpes (transfers: Bus 26 - 81). P+R Tramway
Parc Technologique
Hauts de Feuilly
Salvador Allende
Alfred de Vigny (transfers: Bus 62 - Zi1)
Saint-Priest - Hôtel de Ville (transfers: Bus 50 - 53 - 54 - 62 - 94 - Zi1)
Esplanade des arts (transfers: Bus 50 - 62)
Jules Ferry (transfers Bus 50 - 53 - 94)
Cordière
Saint-Priest - Bel Air (transfers: Bus 50E - 53). P+R Tramway.

Line T3
Operates from 4:27am to 12:08am, maintained by the Centre de Maintenance de Meyzieu.

Codenamed "LEA" (Ligne de L'Est de l'Agglomération), Line T3 runs along a portion of the former CFEL (Compagnie des chemins de fer de l'Est de Lyon) train line from the Gare de l'Est de Lyon to Saint-Genix-d'Aoste (via Crémieu, Jallieu et Montalieu).
Gare Part-Dieu (transfers : Part-Dieu SNCF, Bus 198 - 296. Metro B, Tram T1, Bus C1 - 25 - 28 - 36 - 37 - 41 - 47 - 59 - 59E - 70 - 99 - 175 / Navette Gares Aéroport - Express Crémieu Bourgoin)
Dauphiné - Lacassagne (transfers: Bus 25 - 28 - 34)
Reconnaissance - Balzac (transfer:  Bus 99)
Gare de Villeurbanne (transfer: Bus 38). P+R Tramway
Bel Air - Les Brosses  (transfer: Bus 81) 
Vaulx-en-Velin - La Soie (transfer: Metro A, opening September 20, 2007, Bus 16 - 64 - 68 - Direct Eurexpo). P+R Métro et Tramway
Décines - Centre (transfer: Bus 67). P+R Tramway
Décines-Charpieu - Grand Large (transfers: Bus 7 - 16 - 67 - 85 - 95). P+R Tramway
Meyzieu - Gare (transfer: Bus 67). P+R Tramway
Meyzieu - ZI  (transfer: Bus Zi2). P+R Tramway.

Line T3, which is 14.6 km long, runs largely on ballasted railroad track. It takes 23 minutes to go from Part-Dieu Villette to Meyzieu - ZI, and runs at a maximum speed of 70 km/h (60 km/h at intersections, of which 26 are equipped with crossing gates). 7 km run near residential areas and are equipped with a noise barrier.

Line T4

Line T4 runs between Jet d'Eau and Cliniques Feyzin. A future extension is planned from Gare Part-Dieu to Jet d'Eau.

Jet d'Eau - Mendès France ( : Tram T2)
Lycée Lumière
États-Unis - Musée Tony Garnier
Professeur Beauvisage - CISL
États-Unis - Viviani
Joliot Curie - Marcel Sembat
La Borelle
Gare de Vénissieux (transfer: Metro D). P+R Métro
Croizat - Paul Bert
Marcel Houël - Hôtel de Ville
Lycée Jacques Brel
Herriot - Cagne
Vénissy
Division Leclerc
Maurice Thorez
Lénine - Corsière
Darnaise
Hôpital Feyzin - Vénissieux.

Rhônexpress

Rhônexpress is an express line which will link Part-Dieu Villette to Saint-Exupéry airport, with intermediate stops at Vaulx-en-Velin – La Soie (transfer to Metro Line A) and Meyzieu ZI. It was scheduled to open in 2009. The Conseil général of the Rhône franchised the operation of this line for 30 years to Rhônexpress, a consortium including Vinci SA (28.2%), Veolia Transport (28.2%), Vossloh Infrastructure Service (4.2%), Cegelec Centre Est (2,8%) and the Caisse des dépôts et consignationsVille et transports - magazine, January 17, 2007.

Bus and trolleybus
TCL's bus network includes more than one hundred bus routes.
Although greatly reduced compared to 1950, the Lyon trolleybus system is still the largest in France.

Grenoble trams

Grenoble's tram network is 32 km long, and comprises five lines: lines A, B, C, D and E. Line A was opened in 1987, line B in 1990, line C entered into service in 2006, line D opened in 2007, and line E in 2014. A previous network of tramways existed in Grenoble between 1894 and 1952. Grenoble became the second French city to reintroduce the tramway, after Nantes.

Rolling stock

The Tramway de Grenoble is served by a total of 88 pieces of rolling stock. Of those, 58 are TFS trams and the other 35 put in service on the occasion of the opening of the B line extension and the C line are Alstom Citadis trams.

Network
The network comprises 65 stations, 12 of which are shared by two lines. Line A has 29 stations, line B has 20 stations, line C has 19 stations, line D has 6 stations and line E has 17 stations. Projects for extensions are : line A extension (North: from Fontaine to Sassenage - South: from Échirolles to Pont-de-Claix); line D extensions (North: from Universités to Meylan - South: from Étienne Grappe to Grand'Place)

Bus lines
Urban Bus lines:
1 Grenoble Trois Dauphins - Claix Pont Rouge / Varces République.
3 Le Fontanil Croix de la Rochette / Saint-Égrève Rochepleine - Grenoble Chavant
9 La Tronche Grand Sablon - Meylan La Détourbe
11 Échirolles Comboire - Universités Biologie / Gières Universités IUT UFRAPS
2 Eybens Les Poulardes - Eybens La Grange du Chateau
13 Échirolles La Luire - Grenoble Trois Dauphins
16 La Tronche Cimetière du Grand Sablon / Grenoble Verdun Préfecture - Pont de Claix Flotibulle
17 Le Gua Les Saillants - Grenoble Trois Dauphins
21 Grenoble Verdun Préfecture -  Gières Le Japin
23 Saint Martin d'Hères Neyrpic Belledonne - Grand'Place / Seyssins Le Prisme
26 Grand'Place / Fontaine Place du Néron - Universités Biologie
30 Grenoble Gare Europole / Saint Égrève  Cap des H'  - Saint Égrève Gare
31 Eybens Le Verderet - Meylan Maupertuis
32 Eybens Maisons Neuves - Corenc Montfleury / Meylan Lycée du Grésivaudan
33 Grenoble Petite Esplanade - Saint Martin d'Hères Les Alloves / Le Carina
34 Sassenage Le Château / Grenoble Polygone Scientifique - Poisat Prémol
41 Grenoble Docteur Martin - Domène Chenevières / Les Arnauds
51 Sassenage Les Engenières / L'Ovalie - Seyssinet-Pariset Cimetière / Seyssins Le Prisme
55 Sassenage Maladière - Seyssinet-Pariset Village
56 Fontaine La Poya - Veurey Mairie / Veurey Le Châtelard
58 Seyssins Les Nalettes - Claix Pont Rouge
6020 Grenoble Gare Routière - Meylan Lycée du Grésivaudan

Society of transport in Greater Saint Etienne

The Society of transport in Greater Saint Etienne (STAS) is the name of the company that manages and operates the various lines of trams, trolleybuses and buses of the Greater Saint Etienne.
Organized and funded by Saint-Étienne Métropole, the society is responsible for transportation to the 43 municipalities. The network is structured around two lines of trams, trolley lines and 54 bus lines that run through the agglomeration.

Airports
Rhône-Alpes has several airports, including many regular and seasonal flights to the ski districts.

The largest airport in the region is Lyon-Saint Exupéry Airport. It is located in the heart of the region, so that the main regional cities are within 100 km of the airport. The two other main airports are those of Grenoble and Chambéry. The airports of Grenoble and Chambéry are managed by the same company.

 Lyon-Saint Exupéry Airport: has the largest number of destinations (international) and the highest number of passengers.
 Grenoble-Isère Airport and Chambéry Airport: mainly used by low cost airlines. There is more traffic in winter because of the influx of tourists to the ski resorts, particularly from Great Britain, noted that the airport of Grenoble-Isère has become like Lyon, an international airport.
 Saint-Étienne - Bouthéon Airport
 Annecy - Haute-Savoie - Mont Blanc Airport

Rhône-Alpes transport projects
TER Rhône Alpes
Réseau Express de l'Aire urbaine Lyonnaise
Tramway de Grenoble
Tramway de Saint-Étienne
Rhônexpress
Haut Bugey line

References

Rapid transit in France
Transport in Auvergne-Rhône-Alpes